Eupithecia egregiata is a moth in the family Geometridae. It is found in Afghanistan and Pakistan.

The wingspan is about 18–20 mm. The forewings are soft whitish grey and the hindwings are whitish grey.

References

Moths described in 2008
egregiata
Moths of Asia